Sultan Muhammad Imaaduddeen V (1884–1920), son of Ibrahim Nooraddeen and Bodugaluge Didi of Machchangoalhi Ganduvaru, and also younger half-brother of Muhammad Shamsuddeen III, was the sultan of the Maldives from 1892 to 1893 for five months. He was 8 years old when he became the sultan, after the death of his father Sultan Ibrahim Nooraddeen. Despite having an older half-brother, Imaaduddeen V, was appointed as sultan by a decree of the Council of Ministers (Raskan-hingaa Majlis) headed by Ibrahim Didi, brother-in-law to the late sultan Nooraddeen. Meanwhile, a vigorous protest was handed down to the Ceylon Governor in Colombo by Muhammed Didi, the brother of Kakaage Don Goma, one of the late Sultan Nooraddeen's wives highlighting that the Law of Succession in the Maldive Islands which supported lineal primogeniture has been breached and that his great-nephew Muhammed Shamsuddeen (then Kakaage Doshi Mannipulhu) who was 14 and thus the eldest son of the late Sultan should be the legitimate heir to the throne. Five months later Imaaduddeen was deposed by Muhammad Shamsuddeen III as the Sultan of the Maldives. He died during his brother's reign.

19th-century sultans of the Maldives
1884 births
1920 deaths